Women's softball made its first appearance as an official medal sport at the 1996 Summer Olympics.  The competition was held at historic Golden Park in Columbus, Georgia, United States.  Final results for the Softball competition at the 1996 Summer Olympics:

Medalists

Participants

Competition format
Eight teams competed in the Olympic softball tournament, and the competition consisted of two rounds. The preliminary round followed a round robin format, where each of the teams played all the other teams once. Following this, the top four teams advanced to a Page playoff system round consisting of two semifinal games, and finally the bronze and gold medal games.

Group stage

The top four teams advanced to the semifinal round.

July 21

July 22

July 23

July 24

July 25

July 26

July 27

Medal round
The loser of 1&2 seed game played the winner of the 3&4 seed game in the bronze medal match. The loser of the bronze medal match won the bronze medal while the winner went on to play the winner of the 1&2 seed game for the gold medal in the gold medal match.

Semi finals

Bronze medal match
Winner advanced to gold medal match. Loser won bronze medal.

Gold medal match

Final team standings

References
 Official Olympic Report

1996 Summer Olympics events
1996
Olympics
1996 in softball
Softball competitions in the United States
Women's events at the 1996 Summer Olympics